Ortaköy is a village in the Uludere District in Şırnak province, Turkey. The village is populated by Kurds of the Kaşuran tribe and had a population of 731 in 2021.

History
Ārōsh (today called Ortaköy) was historically inhabited by Assyrian people and located in the Lower Tyari district in the Hakkari region. According to the English missionary George Percy Badger, the village was inhabited by 17 Assyrian families in 1850, all of whom belonged to the Church of the East; this grew to 20 families in 1877 when visited by Edward Lewes Cutts, by which time a church had also been built. Ārōsh was served as part of the diocese of the Patriarch of the Church of the East. The village was destroyed by the Ottoman Army in June 1915 amidst the Sayfo.

References

Bibliography

Villages in Uludere District
Kurdish settlements in Şırnak Province
Historic Assyrian communities in Turkey
Places of the Assyrian genocide